Johannes Meppen, O.S.A. (died 15 Nov 1496) was a Roman Catholic prelate who served as Auxiliary Bishop of Münster (1495–1496) and Auxiliary Bishop of Osnabrück (1477–1495).

Biography
Johannes Meppen was ordained a priest in the Order of Saint Augustine. On 24 Jan 1477, he was appointed during the papacy of Pope Sixtus IV as Auxiliary Bishop of Osnabrück and Titular Bishop of Larissa in Syria. on 9 Feb 1477, he was consecrated bishop. On 24 Jan 1477, he was appointed during the papacy of Pope Nicholas V as Auxiliary Bishop of Münster. He served as Auxiliary Bishop of Münster until his death in 1469.

References 

15th-century German Roman Catholic bishops
Bishops appointed by Pope Sixtus IV
1496 deaths
Augustinian bishops